Brian LeClair (born October 17, 1968) is a Minnesota politician and former member of the Minnesota Senate. A Republican, he was elected in 2002, and served one term representing District 56. He was defeated for reelection in 2006 by Democrat Kathy Saltzman. In the 2010 general election he ran unsuccessfully for district judge in Minnesota's 10th Judicial District, one of 24 candidates to do so.

LeClair served as Health Policy Advisor to former Governor Tim Pawlenty. He is the vice president of LeClair Insurance in Saint Paul.

LeClair earned a B.S. degree from the University of Wisconsin in Madison and an M.B.A and J.D. from Hofstra University. He also holds the CLU and ChFC designations from the American College in Bryn Mawr, Pennsylvania. His writings have appeared in The New York Times and Forbes magazine.

References

External links

"LeClair seeks seat on bench" - Politics in Minnesota 6/10/2010

1968 births
Living people
People from Woodbury, Minnesota
Politicians from Saint Paul, Minnesota
University of Wisconsin–Madison alumni
Hofstra University alumni
Republican Party Minnesota state senators
The American College of Financial Services alumni
21st-century American politicians